Qamchabad (also Romanized as Qamchābād; also known as Kamuchabad, Karichivar, Qomīshābād, Qomshāhābād, and Qumshāhābād) is a village in Howmeh Rural District, in the Central District of Abhar County, Zanjan Province, Iran. At the 2006 census, its population was 561, in 154 families.

References 

Populated places in Abhar County